T. J. Johnson may refer to:

T. J. Johnson (American football)
T. J. Johnson, jazz musician Fellside Records
"T. J.", aka Theodore Jay Jarvis Johnson, redirects to List of Power Rangers characters